Alice Norah Gertrude Greene (15 October 1879 – 26 October 1956) was a female English tennis player from the United Kingdom. She won a silver medal playing tennis at the 1908 Summer Olympics in London. Sometimes referred to as Angela Greene in some references.

Early life
Greene was born at Upton, Northamptonshire on 15 October 1879, the daughter of Richard and Emma Greene. Her father Richard was a medical doctor and superintendent of the Northampton County Lunatic Asylum in Upton.

Tennis
At the October 1907 London Covered Courts Championships at the Queen's Club, Greene won the Ladies Single's title. Greene played at the 1908 Summer Olympics in London and won a silver medal in the women's indoor singles event. Greene also placed fifth in the outdoor singles event. Greene was also an international field hockey player.

Later life
Greene moved to the island of Jersey where she died on 26 October 1956.

In 2010 her Olympic medals were auctioned.

References

1879 births
1956 deaths
British female tennis players
English female field hockey players
Olympic tennis players of Great Britain
Olympic silver medallists for Great Britain
Tennis players at the 1908 Summer Olympics
Olympic medalists in tennis
Medalists at the 1908 Summer Olympics
English female tennis players
People from Upton, Northamptonshire
Tennis people from Northamptonshire